The term chat room, or chatroom (and sometimes group chat; abbreviated as GC), is primarily used to describe any form of synchronous conferencing, occasionally even asynchronous conferencing. The term can thus mean any technology, ranging from real-time online chat and online interaction with strangers (e.g., online forums) to fully immersive graphical social environments.

The primary use of a chat room is to share information via text with a group of other users. Generally 
speaking, the ability to converse with multiple people in the same conversation differentiates chat rooms from instant messaging programs, which are more typically designed for one-to-one communication. The users in a particular chat room are generally connected via a shared internet or other similar connection, and chat rooms exist catering for a wide range of subjects. New technology has enabled the use of file sharing and webcams.

History 

The first chat system was used by the U.S. government in 1971. It was developed by Murray Turoff, a young PhD graduate from Berkeley, and its first use was during President Nixon's wage-price freeze under Project Delphi. The system was called EMISARI and would allow 10 regional offices to link together in a real-time online chat known as the party line. It was in use up until 1986.  The first public online chat system was called Talkomatic, created by Doug Brown and David R. Woolley in 1973 on the PLATO System at the University of Illinois. It offered several channels, each of which could accommodate up to five people, with messages appearing on all users' screens character-by-character as they were typed. Talkomatic was very popular among PLATO users into the mid-1980s. In 2014 Brown and Woolley released a web-based version of Talkomatic.

The first dedicated online chat service that was widely available to the public was the CompuServe CB Simulator in 1980, created by CompuServe executive Alexander "Sandy" Trevor in Columbus, Ohio. Chat rooms gained mainstream popularity with AOL.

Jarkko Oikarinen created Internet Relay Chat (IRC) in 1988.  Many peer-to-peer clients have chat rooms, e.g. Ares Galaxy, eMule, Filetopia, Retroshare, Vuze, WASTE, WinMX, etc. Many popular social media platforms are now used as chat rooms, such as WhatsApp, Meta, Twitter, and TikTok.

Graphical multi-user environments 
Visual chat rooms add graphics to the chat experience, in either 2D or 3D (employing virtual reality technology). These are characterized by using a graphic representation of the user, an avatar virtual elements such as games (in particular massively multiplayer online games) and educational material most often developed by individual site owners, who in general are simply more advanced users of the systems. The most popular environments, such as The Palace, also allow users to create or build their own spaces. Some of the most popular 3D chat experiences are IMVU and Second Life (though they extend far beyond just chat). Many such implementations generate profit by selling virtual goods to users at a high margin.
 
Some online chat rooms also incorporate audio and video communications, so that users may actually see and hear each other.

Games 
Games are also often played in chat rooms. These are typically implemented by an external process such as an IRC bot joining the room to conduct the game. Trivia question & answer games are most prevalent. A historic example is Hunt the Wumpus. Chatroom-based implementations of the party game Mafia also exist. A similar, but more complex style of text-based gaming are MUDs, in which players interact within a textual, interactive fiction–like environment.

Rules of behavior 
Chat rooms, particularly those intended for children, usually have rules that they require users to follow. The rules are generally posted before entry, either on a web page or an MOTD-type banner in the case of IRC and other text-based chat systems. Rules usually do not allow users to use offensive/rude language, or to promote hate, violence, and other negative issues. Many also disallow impersonating another user. Chat rooms often do not allow advertising or "flooding", which is continually filling the screen with repetitive text. Typing with caps lock on is usually considered shouting (suggesting anger) and is discouraged. Offenders of these rules can be "kicked" (temporarily ejected from the room, but allowed back in) or banned completely, either on a temporary or permanent basis.

Sometimes chat room venues are moderated either by limiting who is allowed to speak (not common), by having comments be approved by moderators (often presented as asking questions of a guest or celebrity), or by having moderation volunteers patrol the venue watching for disruptive or otherwise undesirable behavior. Yet, most commonly used chat rooms are not moderated and users may chat freely with the other occupants of the room.

See also
 Email
 Internet Relay Chat
 List of chat websites
 Online chat

References

External links

 The Psychology of Cyberspace (2006)—E-book exploring the psychological aspects of online environments by Dr. John Suler, Rider University
 

1990s fads and trends
2000s fads and trends
Internet culture
Internet forum terminology